Bonny Eagle High School is a public high school located in Standish, Maine, United States. The school is a part of Maine School Administrative District 6, which serves the towns of Buxton (including Bar Mills), Hollis, Limington, Frye Island, and Standish (including Steep Falls).

Sports and interscholastic activities 
Bonny Eagle High School offers a variety of sports teams including Cross Country, Football, Soccer, Cheerleading, Field Hockey, Golf, Indoor/Outdoor Track, Basketball, Wrestling, Ice Hockey, Swimming, Softball, Baseball, Tennis, and Volleyball. The Scots have had a very strong sports record, most notably the Cross Country team who won 3 state titles in a row, Field Hockey, Basketball and Football teams. One consistently strong team is football. The program won four state championships in five years, capturing the Class A Maine State Championships in 2004, 2005, 2007, and 2008. The team was undefeated in the 2004 and 2007 seasons. Their most recent title win came in 2013 against an undefeated Cheverus team.
Bonny Eagle also is home to many clubs and organizations, which a large portion of the student body is a part of. These activities include National Honor Society, Key club, Robotics Team, Outing Club, Kindness Team, GSTA Club, FACS, International Club, Mock Trial, Model UN, Newspaper, and various other activities.

Notable alumni 
 Mike Brown — mixed martial arts fighter
 Nathan Carlow — politician
 Jeff Neal — drummer and vocalist
 Alan Taylor — historian

2009 national news 
In 2009, the Maine School Administrative District #6 Superintendent Suzanne Lukas  denied a graduating senior his diploma for bowing and blowing a kiss to his mother as he went up to the stage.

References

Public high schools in Maine
High schools in Cumberland County, Maine
Standish, Maine